The 1953 Volta a Catalunya was the 33rd edition of the Volta a Catalunya cycle race and was held from 6 September to 13 September 1953. The race started in Montjuïc and finished in Barcelona. The race was won by Salvador Botella.

General classification

References

1953
Volta
1953 in Spanish road cycling
September 1953 sports events in Europe